Howard Leigh
Howard Leigh (born 1935), Australian radio personality and sports journalist,
Howard Leigh, Baron Leigh of Hurley (born 1959), British businessman and politician